Hedgecourt is a  biological Site of Special Scientific Interest west of Felbridge in Surrey.

Hedgecourt Lake is an ancient mill pond formed by damming the Eden Brook. Other habitats are fen, grassland and woodland. There are wetland breeding birds such as water rail, mute swan, sedge warbler, kingfisher and tufted duck.

External links
Surrey County Council map of SSSIs

References

Surrey Wildlife Trust
Sites of Special Scientific Interest in Surrey
Lakes of Surrey